Elements is the thirteenth solo studio album by guitarist Steve Howe.

Track listing

Tour 
In March 2004, Howe toured in promotion of the record.  Under the moniker "Remedy", his live band was:
Steve Howe - vocals, electric guitar, acoustic guitar, pedal steel
Ray Fenwick - electric guitar
Derrick Taylor - bass guitar
Virgil Howe - keyboards, vocals
Dylan Howe - drums

Credits 
The following people appeared either in performance or production of the studio album.
Steve Howe - vocals, electric guitar, acoustic guitar, pedal steel, dobro, mandolin, dulcimer
Virgil Howe - keyboards, vocals
Gilad Atzmon - alto saxophone, tenor saxophone, baritone saxophone, clarinet, flute
Derrick Taylor - bass guitar
Dylan Howe - drums
Jamie Talbot - alto saxophone
Stan Sulzmann -  tenor saxophone
Philip Todd - baritone saxophone
Derek Watkins - trumpet
Simon Gardner - trumpet, flugelhorn
Mark Nightingale - trombone
Neil Sidwell - trombone
Cameron McBride - engineering
Curtis Schwartz - mixing
Andrew Jackman - arranging

References

Steve Howe (musician) albums
2003 albums
Albums with cover art by Roger Dean (artist)
Inside Out Music albums